Brent Hodge (born July 9, 1985) is a Canadian-New Zealander documentary filmmaker and entrepreneur. He is best known for his documentaries I Am Chris Farley, A Brony Tale, The Pistol Shrimps, Freaks and Geeks: The Documentary, Chris Farley: Anything for a Laugh, Who Let the Dogs Out and Pharma Bro. He has been nominated for six Leo Awards for his documentary movies Winning America, What Happens Next? and A Brony Tale, winning one for A Brony Tale in 2015. He was nominated for two Shorty Awards under the "director" category in 2014 and 2015 for his work on The Beetle Roadtrip Sessions and A Brony Tale. Hodge also won a Canadian Screen Award in 2014  for directing The Beetle Roadtrip Sessions with Grant Lawrence.

The documentary The Pistol Shrimps (2016), follows a LA-based female basketball team, the Pistol Shrimps — including actress Aubrey Plaza and founder Maria Blasucci (Drunk History) — who come together for weekly matches filled with trash-talking, hard-fouling, wisecracking action. The documentary was co-produced with Warrior Poets and Morgan Spurlock as executive producer. The documentary won a Founders Award at Michael Moore's Traverse City Film Festival in July 2016. The film is distributed by NBC's subscription streaming service, Seeso and available online.

Hodge directed I Am Chris Farley in 2015 with Derik Murray of Network Entertainment. The documentary is based on the life of comedian actor Chris Farley and features interviews with numerous actors, comedians and others who worked with Farley during his career. The film was long listed for an Academy Award.

In 2014, Hodge released his critically acclaimed documentary A Brony Tale. It delves into the world of the teenage and adult fans of the television show My Little Pony: Friendship is Magic (called 
"bronies") through the eyes of musician and voice actress Ashleigh Ball on her trip to the 2012 BronyCon.

He has also done corporate work for ESPN, Time magazine, Karlie Kloss, CBC Music, Tourism Alberta, and National Film Board of Canada (for the movie Hue: A Matter of Colour), as well as technology startups Uber, City Storage Systems, Lightstep, Hootsuite and Steve Russell's analytics startup Prism Skylabs.

Early life
Hodge grew up in the City of St. Albert, Alberta, but moved to Victoria, British Columbia at the age of 12. He was first exposed to filmmaking in his entrepreneur class at Mount Douglas Secondary School. After high school he attended University of Victoria for a year before completing a degree in commerce at the University of Otago in Dunedin, New Zealand. Upon completing his degree he returned to Canada, attending School Creative in Vancouver, during which time he did sketch comedy with Chris Kelly, Zahf Paroo as well as Ryan Steele and Amy Goodmurphy from The Ryan and Amy Show. Hodge holds dual citizenship for both New Zealand and Canada.

Hodgee Films

Hodgee Films is a Vancouver-based independent film company. Their films include A Brony Tale, The Pistol Shrimps, Freaks and Geeks: The Documentary, Who Let the Dogs Out and Pharma Bro.

Pharma Bro, co-produced by Blumhouse Productions, profiles Martin Shkreli, the financial entrepreneur and pharmaceutical tycoon from Brooklyn, New York, known for raising the price of an AIDS drug 5500% overnight, buying the sole copy of a Wu-Tang Clan album for $2 million dollars and being convicted of securities fraud. Release for the film is October 5, 2021.

Who Let the Dogs Out tells the origin story of the smash hit song "Who Let the Dogs Out" and goes back further than anyone could have imagined; steeped in legal battles, female empowerment and artist integrity. The film premiered in 2019 at SXSW and can be found on Bell's Crave TV start March 2, 2020.

Produced by A&E Network as part of their "Cultureshock" series, Freaks and Geeks: The Documentary takes you behind the scenes of the beloved cult-classic show created by Paul Feig and executive produced by Judd Apatow. Through intimate interviews with the cast and crew, we learn the story behind the show that holds the unique position of being cancelled after one season while also ranking amongst Time magazine's Greatest Television Shows of all time.

The documentary The Pistol Shrimps (2016), follows a LA-based female basketball team, the Pistol Shrimps — including actress Aubrey Plaza and founder Maria Blasucci (Drunk History) — who come together for weekly matches filled with trash-talking, hard-fouling, wisecracking action. The documentary won a Founders Award at Michael Moore's Traverse City Film Festival in July 2016. The film is distributed by NBC's subscription streaming service, Seeso and available online.

Hodge directed I Am Chris Farley in 2015 with Derik Murray of Network Entertainment. The documentary is based on the life of comedian actor Chris Farley and features interviews with numerous actors, comedians and others who worked with Farley during his career. The film was long listed for an Academy Award.

In 2014, Hodge released his critically acclaimed documentary A Brony Tale. It delves into the world of the teenage and adult fans of the television show My Little Pony: Friendship Is Magic (called "bronies") through the eyes of musician and voice actress Ashleigh Ball on her trip to the 2012 BronyCon. The film was nominated for six 2015 Leo Awards, including "Best Documentary", won "Best Documentary" at the 2014 Las Vegas Film Festival and premiered at the 2014 Tribeca Film Festival.

The company also produced W Network's spinoff series Cameron's House Rules.

In 2014 Hodge was named one of BCBusinesss Top 30 under 30 for his work as CEO of Hodgee Films. Hodge stated that he had given himself a goal to hit a certain revenue target, film globally and bring his work back to Vancouver for post-production work.

The company logo, a white rabbit with the text "Hodgee Films" next to it, was inspired by the film Alice in Wonderland, says CEO of the company Brent Hodge: "I always go back to the little logo I have, which is a white rabbit. It comes from Alice in Wonderland and it's about having that magic in everything we do. Down the rabbit hole."

Filmography

References

External links
 Official website
 
 

1985 births
Living people
Film directors from Alberta
People from St. Albert, Alberta
Writers from Alberta
Canadian documentary film directors
Canadian television directors
English-language film directors
Canadian male screenwriters
Film directors from Victoria, British Columbia
Writers from Victoria, British Columbia
Canadian film editors
Film producers from Alberta
University of Victoria alumni
University of Otago alumni
Canadian people of New Zealand descent